Bellevue Plantation was the U.S. home of Catherine Willis Gray Murat, located in Tallahassee, Florida. It was purchased in 1854 after Catherine's second husband Prince Achille Murat (son of Joachim Murat, Napoleon's brother-in-law and King of Naples from 1808 to 1815) died in 1847. Murat was the great-grandniece of George Washington. She was a daughter of Colonel Byrd C. Willis (August 29, 1781 – 1846) and his wife Mary Lewis. Mary Lewis was the granddaughter of Fielding Lewis, George Washington's brother-in-law. Through the Lewis family, she was also a relative of explorer Meriwether Lewis.

Plantation home
The home was named after the Hotel de Belle-Vue in Brussels, where Catherine and Achille had lived while in Europe. It has been restored and has period furnishings.

The house is now part of the grounds of the Tallahassee Museum and is located in the Old Florida section. Visitors can learn about the area's plantation communities.  There are two adjacent reconstructed building, a plantation kitchen and a slave cabin.

Plantation specifics
The Leon County Florida 1860 Agricultural Census shows that Bellevue Plantation had the following:
 Improved Land: 
 Unimproved Land: 
 Cash value of plantation: $10,000
 Cash value of farm implements/machinery: $200
 Cash value of farm animals: $510
 Number of slaves: 24
 Bushels of corn: N/A
 Bales of cotton: N/A

The owners
During Catherine's years at Bellevue, she became involved in America's first successful preservation effort of Mount Vernon, George Washington's home, through the Mount Vernon Ladies' Association. She was appointed Vice Regent for Florida, the title given the central person in each state organizing the association's work. The state raised $3,791 toward the restoration of Mount Vernon, the largest per capita amount raised by any of the 30 contributing states. During the Civil War, Murat participated in the local "Soldiers Aid Societies," which met as sewing circles to clothe the southern troops. Early in 1866, Napoleon III, who had come to power in France in 1849, granted Murat an annuity from the French government in consideration of her losses during the Civil War. Catherine Murat died August 6, 1867, at Bellevue.

Bellevue was sold to Captain Bloxham who owned the William D. Bloxham Plantation.

References

External links
Tallahassee Museum website

Houses on the National Register of Historic Places in Florida
Museums in Leon County, Florida
Florida in the American Civil War
National Register of Historic Places in Leon County, Florida
Plantations in Leon County, Florida
Farm museums in Florida
American Civil War museums in Florida
Houses in Leon County, Florida
Slave cabins and quarters in the United States